Sa-Re-Ga-Ma-Pa is a 1972 Hindi-language drama film directed by Satyen Bose and is written by Govind Moonis. The film stars Ashok Kumar, Praveen Paul, Vishal Anand and Alka in lead roles. The music was directed by Ganesh, brother of Pyarelal (of Laxmikant-Pyarelal). The songs were sung by famous play-back singers like Lata Mangeshkar, Mohammed Rafi, Kishore Kumar & Manna Dey. This film was originally released during the black & white cinema times.

Cast
 Ashok Kumar as Seth Ghanshyamdas Choudhary
 Sahiraa in a spl.appearance
 Satyen Bose as Sakseria saheb
 Nazneen as Rekha Sharma
 Ruby Chouhan as 
 Alka as Savitri Sharma 
 Suresh Chatwal as Assistant Manager 
 Paintal as Sur Mohan's friend
 Vishal Anand as Govardhan
 Rupesh Kumar as Vijay Pratap Singh
 Jagadeep as 
 Nana Palsikar as B.M.Sharma
 Parveen Paul as Govardhan's Mother
 V Gopal as Jewelry Shop Owner
 Raj Mehra as 
 Janakidas as 
 Moolchand as 
 Pardesi as Maruti Peon
 Manik Datt as 
 Darshan Lal as Inspector

Crew 

 Choreography     = Badri Prasad
  Fight Composer   = M B Shetty
 Art              = G L Jadhav
 Editor           = Mukhtar Ahmed
 Screenplay       = Govind Moonis
 Dialogues        = Govind Moonis
 Story            = Ruby Bose
 Photography      = Anil Mitra
 Lyrics           = Majrooh Sultanpuri
 Music            = Ganesh

References

External links 
 

1972 films
1970s Hindi-language films
1972 drama films